Yahoo (foaled 1981) was a National Hunt racehorse, who is best remembered for finishing second in the 1989 Cheltenham Gold Cup to Desert Orchid. Yahoo was successful on the amateur Point-to-Point circuit, winning at least eleven races. His biggest wins under National Hunt rules included the Rowland Meyrick Chase at Wetherby in 1987, and the Martell Cup at Aintree in 1989.  His last race was a second-place at Worcester in May 1994.

References
 Thoroughbred Database
 Blast from the past: Gold Cup

1981 racehorse births
National Hunt racehorses
Thoroughbred family 13-b
Racehorses bred in Ireland
Racehorses trained in the United Kingdom